Shark Swarm is an American film created by RHI Entertainment. It premiered on Syfy on May 25, 2008. Directed by James A. Contner and written by Matthew Chernov and David Rosiak, the film stars Daryl Hannah, John Schneider and Armand Assante. It was released to generally unfavorable reviews. It is the 11th film in the Maneater Series.

Plot
Corporate real estate tycoon Hamilton Lux (Armand Assante) sets his sights on developing the quaint seaside town of Full Moon Bay, California into a prime getaway for the wealthy, but runs into some unexpected problems. Lifelong fisherman Daniel Wilder (John Schneider) and wife Brooke (Daryl Hannah) own property exactly where Lux wants to build high-priced condos, and isn't planning to sell. Lux secretly laces the local waters with a toxin deadly to marine life, decimating the fishing industry in an attempt to starve Daniel out. Alas, the chemical react differently on the area's sharks, drastically increasing their aggressive tendencies and transforming them into engines of pure destruction moving in coordinated swarms. Without fish to feed on, shark attacks on humans rapidly increase. Lux uses media contacts to paint the attacks as random incidents. Daniel, his marine biologist brother and a concerned E.P.A. agent must expose Lux's plan and rid the area of the chemically-altered sharks before the town's entire population is devoured by hungry sharks.

Cast

Critical reception 

Shark Swarm has been widely panned.

See also
 List of killer shark films

References

External links

 Official RHI Entertainment Shark Swarm website
 Official Genius Entertainment Shark Swarm site
 
 
 

2008 films
2008 television films
2008 horror films
Canadian horror television films
2000s English-language films
Maneater (film series)
Canadian natural horror films
Syfy original films
Films about shark attacks
Films about sharks
Films set in California
American horror television films
Films directed by James A. Contner
2000s American films
2000s Canadian films